Edward Carl Tiemeyer was a Major League Baseball first baseman. He was born on May 9, 1885 in Cincinnati. In 1906–1907, Tiemeyer played for the Cincinnati Reds and in 1909 he played for the New York Highlanders. In his career, Eddie played in 9 games with 5 hits in 19 at-bats. He died on September 27, 1946 in his home town of Cincinnati.

External links
Baseball-Reference

1885 births
1946 deaths
Altoona Mountaineers players
Baseball players from Ohio
Cincinnati Reds players
Holyoke Papermakers players
Indianapolis Hoosiers (minor league) players
Major League Baseball first basemen
Major League Baseball third basemen
Major League Baseball pitchers
New York Highlanders players
St. Paul Saints (AA) players
Syracuse Stars (minor league baseball) players
Trenton Tigers players
Wilkes-Barre Barons (baseball) players